The 2018–19 Dartmouth Big Green men's basketball team represented Dartmouth College during the 2018–19 NCAA Division I men's basketball season. They played their home games at the Leede Arena in Hanover, New Hampshire and were led by third-year head coach David McLaughlin as members of the Ivy League. They finished the season 11–19 overall, 2–12 in Ivy League play, finishing in eighth place, and failed to qualify for the Ivy League tournament.

Previous season
The Big Green finished the 2017–18 season 7–20, 3–11 in Ivy League play to finish in last place and failed to qualify for the Ivy League tournament.

Roster

Schedule and results

|-
!colspan=12 style=| Non-Conference Regular season

|-
!colspan=9 style=| Ivy League regular season

|-

Source

References

Dartmouth Big Green men's basketball seasons
Dartmouth Big Green
Dartmouth Big Green men's basketball team
Dartmouth Big Green men's basketball team